The 2008 Boxing World Cup is a boxing competition between top ranked boxers in different weight categories. It was held in Moscow, Russia from December 10 to December 14.

New format 
The format for the 2008 competition changed when it was announced that the event would take place under a new format and become a biennial event. Whereas before the competition was between teams, now it will be between the top ranked boxers in their weight categories. The winning country will be the one taking more medals than any other, without any group stages as previously.

Results

Light Flyweight (– 48 kg)

Flyweight (– 51 kg)

Bantamweight (– 54 kg)

Featherweight (– 57 kg)

Lightweight (– 60 kg)

Light-Welterweight (– 64 kg)

Welterweight (– 69 kg)

Middleweight (– 75 kg)

Light-Heavyweight (– 81 kg)

Heavyweight (– 91 kg)

Super Heavyweight (+ 91 kg)

Medal table

References

External links
 The announcement about the start of the event (Russian)

Boxing World Cup
World Cup
Boxing
International boxing competitions hosted by Russia
Sports competitions in Moscow
December 2008 sports events in Europe